Adolf Riebe (9 February 1889 – 3 May 1966) was an Austrian football midfielder and manager.

Riebe played for Wien, TV Jahn München, FA Bayern im Münchener SC and SpVgg Fürth.

He later coached Wiener AF, VfvB Ruhrort, Parma, SG Andrea Doria, SpVgg Fürth, Hamburger SV, RC Strasbourg and Warta Poznań.

References

1889 births
1966 deaths
Footballers from Vienna
Austrian footballers
SpVgg Greuther Fürth players
Austrian football managers
Austrian expatriate football managers
Parma Calcio 1913 managers
SpVgg Greuther Fürth managers
Hamburger SV managers
RC Strasbourg Alsace managers
Expatriate football managers in Italy
Expatriate football managers in France
Expatriate football managers in Germany
Expatriate football managers in Poland
Austrian expatriate sportspeople in Italy
Austrian expatriate sportspeople in France
Austrian expatriate sportspeople in Germany
Austrian expatriate sportspeople in Poland
Association football midfielders